Rhaphidophora hayi is a plant of the family Araceae. It is an appressed or shingling semi-epiphytic vining plant native to Queensland and New Guinea, where it grows in monsoon forests and rainforests.  It is grown as a houseplant.

References

hayi
Flora of Queensland
Flora of New Guinea
Plants described in 2000
House plants